The 2012–13 season was the 44th campaign of the Scottish Men's National League. The season featured 10 teams from across Scotland. Falkirk Fury won their 2nd league title.

Teams

The line-up for the 2012-2013 season features the following teams:

Boroughmuir Blaze
City of Edinburgh Kings
Clark Eriksson Fury
Dunfermline Reign
Glasgow Rocks II
Glasgow Storm
Glasgow University
St Mirren Reid Kerr College
Stirling Knights
Troon Tornadoes

League table

Playoffs

Quarter-finals

Semi-finals

Final

References

  Scottish Basketball League 2012-13 - WebArchive 

Scottish Basketball Championship Men seasons
Scot
Scot
basketball
basketball